Mehtar Ahmad (also Romanized as Mehtar Aḩmad; also known as Mahtarābād and Meytaramad) is a village in Mishu-e Jonubi Rural District, Sufian District, Shabestar County, East Azerbaijan Province, Iran. At the 2006 census, its population was 250, in 68 families.

References 

Populated places in Shabestar County